Anikó Gyöngyössy (born 21 May 1990) Hungarian water polo player. She's the centre-forward for BVSC-Zugló until 2022. At the 2020 Summer Olympics she competed for the Hungary women's national water polo team in the women's tournament.

She played with the national team at the 2009 World Aquatics Championships, 2010 Women's European Water Polo Championship, 2019 World Aquatics Championships, 2020 Women's European Water Polo Championship.

References

External links
 

1990 births
Living people
Water polo players from Budapest
Hungarian female water polo players
Water polo players at the 2020 Summer Olympics
Medalists at the 2020 Summer Olympics
Olympic bronze medalists for Hungary in water polo
21st-century Hungarian women